The Meadowvale Town Centre Bus Terminal is the main, inter-regional transit hub for the community of Meadowvale located in northwestern Mississauga, Ontario, Canada. It is the third-largest terminal served by MiWay, the second-largest in Mississauga after City Centre Transit Terminal. It is situated on the eastern side of Meadowvale Town Centre, which is a community mall.

The terminal does not contain a building, partly due to the terminal being located directly beside the mall. Instead, it is composed of a big bus loop with benches and bus shelters surrounding it. MiWay buses lay over in the middle of the bus loop.

MiWay tickets and passes can be bought either at Shoppers Drug Mart, which is located within Meadowvale Town Centre; or at the Meadowvale Community Centre, located at the intersection of Glen Erin Drive and Aquitaine Avenue. The nearest GO Transit ticket agency for this terminal is at a branch of Rabba Fine Foods located at the intersection of Derry Road and Glen Erin Drive, just north of the Meadowvale Community Centre.

Bus routes
Bus service within the terminal itself is exclusively by MiWay. However, GO Transit indirectly serves the terminal by stopping at the intersection of Aquitaine Avenue and Formentera Avenue, which requires a short walk from the bus loop.

MiWay
All routes are wheelchair-accessible.

GO Transit
GO Transit buses stop at the intersection of Aquitaine Avenue and Formentera Avenue. Standard bus shelters are located along both directions of Aquitaine Avenue.

References

MiWay
Bus stations in Ontario